Cerialis or Cerealis is a Latin term which means "of Ceres", "pertaining to Ceres", and may refer to:

 Neratius Cerealis, Roman consul
 Quintus Petillius Cerialis, Roman governor of Britain
 Sextus Vettulenus Cerialis, Roman consul

See also